The 1973 Atlanta Braves season was the eighth season in Atlanta along with the 103rd season as a franchise overall.  The highlight of the season was Hank Aaron finishing the season just one home run short of Babe Ruth as baseball's all-time home run king.  The 1973 Atlanta Braves were the first team to boast three 40 home run hitters.  They were Aaron, Darrell Evans, and Davey Johnson. Also of note, it marked the only time in Johnson's career that he hit 40 home runs in one season.

Offseason 
 October 27, 1972: Rico Carty was traded by the Braves to the Texas Rangers for Jim Panther.
 January 10, 1973: Brian Asselstine was drafted by the Braves in the 1st round (15th pick) of the 1973 Major League Baseball Draft (Secondary Phase).
 January 21, 1973: Curt Blefary was signed as a free agent by the Braves.
 February 28, 1973: Pat Jarvis was traded by the Braves to the Montreal Expos for Carl Morton.
 March 26, 1973: Denny McLain was released by the Braves.

Regular season

Season standings

Record vs. opponents

Opening Day starters 
 Hank Aaron
 Dusty Baker
 Darrell Evans
 Ralph Garr
 Gary Gentry
 Rod Gilbreath
 Davey Johnson
 Johnny Oates
 Marty Perez

Notable transactions 
 May 19, 1973: Andre Thornton was traded by the Braves to the Chicago Cubs for Joe Pepitone.
 June 7, 1973: Pat Dobson was traded by the Braves to the New York Yankees for Frank Tepedino, Wayne Nordhagen, and players to be named later. The Yankees completed the deal by sending Dave Cheadle to the Braves on August 15 and Al Closter to the Braves on September 5.
 June 19, 1973: Joe Pepitone was released by the Braves.

Hank Aaron's Chase for the Record 
At the age of 39, Aaron managed to slug 40 home runs in 392 at bats, ending the season with 713, which at that time one home run short of the record. He hit home run number 713 on September 29, 1973, and with one day remaining in the season, many expected him to tie the record. But in his final game that year, playing against the Houston Astros (led by manager Leo Durocher, who had once roomed with Babe Ruth), he was unable to hit one out of the park. After the game, Aaron stated that his only fear was that he might not live to see the 1974 season. That statement was not just about the death threats: one year earlier, September 30, 1972, was the last day that the legendary Roberto Clemente ever played, as he perished in the offseason.

Roster

Player stats

Batting

Starters by position 
Note: Pos = Position; G = Games played; AB = At bats; H = Hits; Avg. = Batting average; HR = Home runs; RBI = Runs batted in

Other batters 
Note: G = Games played; AB = At bats; H = Hits; Avg. = Batting average; HR = Home runs; RBI = Runs batted in

Pitching

Starting pitchers 
Note: G = Games pitched; IP = Innings pitched; W = Wins; L = Losses; ERA = Earned run average; SO = Strikeouts

Other pitchers 
Note: G = Games pitched; IP = Innings pitched; W = Wins; L = Losses; ERA = Earned run average; SO = Strikeouts

Relief pitchers 
Note: G = Games pitched; W = Wins; L = Losses; SV = Saves; ERA = Earned run average; SO = Strikeouts

Awards and honors

League records 
Davey Johnson, Tied Rogers Hornsby's record for most home runs in one season by a National League second baseman (42)

All-Stars 
1973 Major League Baseball All-Star Game
 Hank Aaron, first baseman, starter
 Darrell Evans, reserve
 Davey Johnson, reserve

Farm system 

Kinston affiliation shared with New York Yankees

Notes

References 

 1973 Atlanta Braves team page at Baseball Reference
 1973 Atlanta Braves team page at www.baseball-almanac.com

Atlanta Braves seasons
Atlanta Braves season
Atlanta